Simon Osborn Giffin (June 8, 1870 – February 11, 1935) was a merchant and political figure in Nova Scotia, Canada. He represented Guysborough County in the Nova Scotia House of Assembly from 1925 to 1928 as a Liberal-Conservative member.

He was born at East Side, Isaac's Harbour, Guysborough County, Nova Scotia, the son of Samuel R. Giffin and Harriet Jane Reid. In 1894, Giffin married Stella Lee McMillan. He died in Guysborough at the age of 64.

References 
 A Directory of the Members of the Legislative Assembly of Nova Scotia, 1758-1958, Public Archives of Nova Scotia (1958)

1870 births
1935 deaths
Progressive Conservative Association of Nova Scotia MLAs